Parnell railway station is a station serving the inner-city suburb of Parnell in Auckland, New Zealand. It is situated on the Newmarket Line, approximately 600m north of Parnell Tunnel, and is located in the Waipapa Valley adjacent to Auckland Domain. It serves Southern Line and Western Line trains.

The station opened on 12 March 2017 with relatively basic facilities and initially serving a limited number of lines. Future development will involve building a second pedestrian underpass under the tracks to provide step-free access to the platforms, and constructing several new paths to provide more direct access to Auckland Domain, Parnell Town Centre and the University of Auckland.

It was originally intended that the station would eventually serve all three lines which pass through it. This was contingent on the removal of the Sarawia Street level crossing in Newmarket, removing the signalling constraints which affected the line. A bridge built to replace the level crossing, linking Laxon Terrace with nearby Cowie Street, allowed the removal of the crossing.

History

After a plan to lease part of the area as a bus depot was cancelled, KiwiRail and Auckland Council were asked in 2010 by the outgoing Auckland Regional Council (ARC) to make an early start on construction of the proposed station, which was to cost $13 million or more, to ensure that there would not need to be costly extra work after the electrification of the line as part of the Auckland railway electrification. It was proposed that several million dollars saved during the upgrade of the Newmarket station be allocated to this new station.

Three station locations were proposed ARC staff - including at the Parnell Bridge Overpass, Carlaw Park, and Cheshire Street.

Lobbying by the Parnell Business Association, local residents, and councillor Mike Lee saw the Cheshire Street location chosen for the station. The new location was suggested in order to serve as a "niche station for visitors to the heritage Parnell precinct and the Auckland War Memorial Museum." The location of the station has been criticised for its poor accessibility and perceived weaker outcomes. 

The early proposal would also integrate the new station with some of the historic railway workshop sheds of the adjacent Mainline Steam depot but nothing eventuated. The Mainline Steam Heritage Trust had its lease on the depot terminated by KiwiRail and completed its move from the site in June 2015. The sheds were demolished in September 2015.

The heritage station building from the Newmarket station (a historic building designed by George Troup and built in 1908 that was removed during a 2008–10 upgrade) was relocated onto the Parnell station platform in 2016-17. As of early 2019, the station building is used to house artist studios and a gallery.

In late 2015, Auckland Transport advised that opening the Parnell station to passenger services was being postponed until the completion of a road bridge at Cowie Street, replacing the nearby level crossing on Sarawia Street. AT received approval from independent planning commissioners in June 2016. The following November, the commissioners' recommendation for the bridge was appealed. If AT had been unable to address the concerns expressed in the appeal, an Environment Court hearing (most likely in early 2017) would have decided whether the appeal would be upheld.

Trains began operating at the station on 12 March 2017, with an official opening by Mayor of Auckland, Phil Goff, and Waitematā Local Board chair Pippa Coom on 13 March 2017.

In July–August 2018, the Cowie Street bridge to Laxon Terrace was completed and opened and the Sarawia Street level crossing was closed to road traffic. As a result, a new timetable introduced on 26 August 2018 allowed Parnell to become a stop on all Southern Line and Western Line services.

Station layout
The station is located next to the Auckland Domain, where the Auckland War Memorial Museum is situated. The two side platforms are linked by a subway.

Future work will provide walking links to the Domain and the campuses of the University of Auckland and Auckland University of Technology. In mid-November 2018, a walkway was established connecting the Parnell Station to the University of Auckland's Carlaw Park Student Village and the Carlaw business centre, which is near the University of Auckland's City Campus on Symonds Street.

In late 2022 Auckland Transport announced it had received consent to construct a second pedestrian underpass at the northern end of Parnell Station, to provide step-free access to all platforms and a more direct way to cross the tracks. Completion is expected in late 2023.

See also
 List of Auckland railway stations

References 

Rail transport in Auckland
Railway stations in New Zealand
Railway stations opened in 2017
Buildings and structures in Auckland
2017 establishments in New Zealand
Auckland Domain
Parnell, New Zealand